The Sound and the Fury is a 1929 novel by American author William Faulkner.

The Sound and the Fury may also refer to:

In film and television 
The Sound and the Fury (1959 film), a 1959 film adaptation of Faulkner's novel
The Sound and the Fury (2014 film), a 2014 film adaptation of the novel
"The Sound and the Fury" (The Flash), an episode of The Flash

In music 
The Sound and The Fury (vocal ensemble), an English-German vocal group performing renaissance polyphony
The Sound and the Fury, a musical composition by Robert W. Smith
The Sound and the Fury, a 2011 compilation album by Billy Fury
The Sound and the Fury (album), a 2015 studio album by Nerina Pallot

In sports 
Evander Holyfield vs. Mike Tyson II, a heavyweight boxing championship match billed as The Sound and the Fury

See also 
Sound and Fury (disambiguation)
The Sound of Fury (disambiguation)